The 2021 Missouri Valley Conference women's basketball tournament, promoted as Hoops in the Heartland, was part of the 2020–21 NCAA Division I women's basketball season and was played in Moline, Illinois, March 11–14, 2021, at the TaxSlayer Center. On March 13, prior to the semifinal game between Missouri State and Bradley, Missouri State withdrew from the tournament. The remaining teams were reseeded, Bradley was rescheduled to play Loyola Chicago, and top-seeded Drake advanced to the finals, awaiting their opponent. Bradley won the tournament, its first title, receiving the Missouri Valley Conference's automatic bid to the 2021 NCAA tournament.

Seeds

Schedule

Tournament bracket

* denotes overtime

See also
 2021 Missouri Valley Conference men's basketball tournament

References

External links
Hoops in the Heartland
Missouri Valley Conference Official Website

2020–21 Missouri Valley Conference women's basketball season
Missouri Valley Conference women's basketball tournament
Basketball in Illinois